KEFH (99.3 FM) is a radio station broadcasting a classic hits format. Licensed to Clarendon, Texas, US, it serves the Amarillo area. The station is currently owned by Donna and Joe Davis, through licensee Davis Broadcast Co., Inc.

External links

Classic hits radio stations in the United States
EFH
Radio stations established in 1962